
Year 443 (CDXLIII) was a common year starting on Friday (link will display the full calendar) of the Julian calendar. At the time, it was known as the Year of the Consulship of Maximus and Paterius (or, less frequently, year 1196 Ab urbe condita). The denomination 443 for this year has been used since the early medieval period, when the Anno Domini calendar era became the prevalent method in Europe for naming years.

Events 
 By place 

 Europe 
 The Burgundians sign a peace treaty with Rome, agreeing to serve as foederati in the Roman army. They begin to move from the Upper Rhine and Flavius Aetius, commander-in-chief (magister militum), gives them land in the Geneva area (Maxima Sequanorum). 
 Period of civil war and famine in Britain, caused by rival kingdoms and Pictish invasions; the situation aggravates tensions between Pelagian and Roman factions. Pro-Roman citizens migrate towards Gaul. 

 By topic 

 Religion 
 Gunabhadra, Indian Buddhist monk, is an invited honored guest by emperor Wen of Liu Song (Liu Song Dynasty). He translates the Lankavatara Sutra from Sanskrit into the Chinese language.

Births

Deaths 
 Zong Bing, Chinese artist and musician

References